Lanai (also ,) is the sixth-largest of the Hawaiian Islands and the smallest publicly accessible inhabited island in the chain. It is colloquially known as the Pineapple Island because of its past as an island-wide pineapple plantation. The island's only settlement of note is the small town of Lanai City. , the island was 98% owned by Larry Ellison, co-founder and chairman of Oracle Corporation; the remaining 2% is owned by the state of Hawaii or is privately owned homes.

It is separated from the island of Molokai by the Kalohi Channel to the north, and from Maui by the Auau Channel to the east. The United States Census Bureau defines Lanai as Census Tract 316 of Maui County. Its total population rose to 3,367 as of the 2020 United States census, up from 3,193 as of the 2000 census and 3,131 as of the 2010 census. As visible via satellite imagery, many of the island's landmarks are accessible only by dirt roads that require a four-wheel drive vehicle due to the lack of paved roadways.

There is one school, Lanai High and Elementary School, serving the entire island from kindergarten through 12th grade. There is also one hospital, Lanai Community Hospital, with 24 beds, and a community health center providing primary care, dental, behavioral health and selected specialty services in Lanai City. There are no traffic lights on the island.

History
Lanai was under the control of nearby Maui before recorded history. Its first inhabitants may have arrived as late as the 15th century.

The Hawaiian-language name  is of uncertain origin, but the island has historically been called , which can be rendered in English as "day of the conquest of Kauluāau." This epithet refers to a legend about a Mauian prince who was banished to Lanai because of his wild pranks at his father's court in Lāhainā. The island was said to be haunted by Akua-ino, ghosts and goblins that Kauluāau chased away, bringing peace and order to the island and regaining his father's favor as a consequence.

The first people to migrate here, most likely from Maui and Molokai, probably established fishing villages along the coast at first, and then spread into the interior, where they raised taro in the fertile volcanic soil. During most of this period, the Mōī of Maui had control over Lanai, but generally left its inhabitants alone. However, at some point, King Kamehameha I or Kalaniōpuu-a-Kaiamamao invaded and killed many of them. The population must have been decimated by 1792, because in that year  Captain George Vancouver reported that he had ignored the island during his voyage because of its apparent lack of inhabitants or villages. Lanai is said to have been Kamehameha's favorite fishing spot among Hawaii's main eight islands.

The history of sugar-growing in Hawaii begins in Lanai, when in 1802 a farmer from China, Wong Tse Chun, produced a small amount there. He used a crude stone mill that he had brought with him to crush the cane.

In 1854 a group of members of the Church of Jesus Christ of Latter-day Saints were granted a lease in the ahupuaa of Pālāwai. In 1862 Walter M. Gibson arrived on Lānaʻi to reorganize the settlement. A year later he bought the ahupuaa of Pālāwai for $3000; he used money of the church but titled the land in his own name. When the members of the Church of Jesus Christ of Latter-day Saints found this out they excommunicated him, but he was still able to retain ownership of the land. By the 1870s, Walter M. Gibson, then the leader of the colony on the island, had acquired most of the island’s land, which he used for ranching.

By 1890, the population of Lānaʻi had been reduced to 200. In 1899, Gibson's daughter and son-in-law formed Maunalei Sugar Company, headquartered in Keomuku, on the windward (northeast) coast, downstream from Maunalei Valley. The company failed in 1901. However, between 1899 and 1901 nearly 800 laborers, mostly from Japan, had been contracted to work for the plantations. Many Native Hawaiians continued to live along the less arid windward coast, supporting themselves by ranching and fishing.

In 1909, Charles Gay sold the island to William G. Irwin for one dollar.  Irwin's title was upheld in the U.S. Supreme Court.

In 1921, Charles Gay planted the first pineapple plant on Lanai. The population had  decreased again - to 150 -  most of whom were the descendants of the traditional families of the island. A year later, James Dole, the president of Hawaiian Pineapple Company (later renamed Dole Food Company), bought the island and developed a large portion of it into the world's largest pineapple plantation.

Upon Hawaii statehood in 1959, Lanai became part of the Maui County.

In 1985, Lanai passed into the control of David H. Murdock as a result of his purchase of Castle & Cooke, which was  then the owner of Dole. High labor- and land costs led to a decline in Hawaii pineapple production in the 1980s, and Dole phased out its pineapple operations on Lanai in 1992.

In June 2012, Larry Ellison, then CEO of Oracle Corporation, purchased Castle & Cooke's 98 percent share of the island for $300 million. The state and individual homeowners own the remaining 2 percent, which includes the harbor and the private homes where the 3,000 inhabitants live. Ellison, who believes renewable energy must be cost-competitive with fossil fuels in order to be viable, stated his intention to invest as much as $500 million to improve the island's infrastructure and create an environmentally friendly agricultural industry. , Ellison had spent an estimated $450 million to remodel his Four Seasons Resort Lanai at Manele Bay, which reopened in April 2016 after a seven-month shutdown. In Lanai City, he built a new water-filtration system and a resort-style, Olympic-size public pool. He also refurbished the historic movie theater (built in the 1920s but mostly shut since the 1970s), turning it into a state-of-the art movie house. His second Four Seasons Resort, at Kōele in the mountains, was renovated and reopened as Sensei Lanaʻi in 2020. Ellison also started a solar-powered hydroponic farming venture, “Sensei,” which has two 20,000-square-foot computer-monitored greenhouses, and he plans to build four more.

Until 2020, Ellison was in negotiations to purchase the diesel-powered utility assets of the island in order to build a sustainable power system consisting of solar power and batteries. However, it was reported in May 2020 that, while plans to transition from using fossil fuels to renewable resources continue, the talks by Ellison's company to acquire the utility had ended.

Legends
According to the Hawaiian legends, man-eating spirits occupied the island. For generations, Maui chiefs believed in these man-eating spirits. Differing legends say that either the prophet Lanikāula drove the spirits from the island or the unruly Maui prince Kauluāau accomplished that heroic feat. The more popular myth is that the mischievous Kauluāau pulled up every breadfruit tree (ulu) he could find on Maui. Finally his father, Kakaalaneo had to banish him to Lanai, expecting him not to survive in that hostile place. However, Kauluāau outwitted the spirits and drove them from the island. The chief looked across the channel from Maui and saw that his son's fire continued to burn nightly on the shore, and he sent a canoe to Lanai to bring the prince back, redeemed by his courage and cleverness. As a reward, Kakaalaneo gave Kauluāau control of the island and encouraged emigration from other islands. Kauluāau had, in the meantime, pulled up all the breadfruit trees on Lanai, accounting for the historic lack of them on that island.

Geography
The highest point in Lanai is Mount Lānaihale. It is an inactive volcano near the center of the island and to the east of Lanai City.

Lanai was traditionally administered in 13 political subdivisions (Ahupuaa), grouped into two districts (mokuoloko): kona (Leeward) and koolau (Windward). The ahupuaa are listed below, in clockwise sequence, and with original area figures in acres, starting in the northwest of the island.

Kamoku hosts the largest share of population, because the bigger part of Lanai City falls into it. Parts of Lanai City stretch to Kaa and Paomai. , the remaining ahupuaa were virtually uninhabited. According to the census of 2000, Lanai City accounts for 99 percent of the island population (3164 of 3193). As a census-designated place, Lanai City is defined solely for statistical purposes, and not by administrative boundaries.

Tourism

Tourism on Lanai began to be prominent in more recent history as the pineapple and sugarcane industries were phased out in the islands. The number of visitors coming to the island is still relatively small, however, with around 59,000 arrivals forecast for 2016—of all the publicly accessible Hawaiian islands only Molokai attracts fewer visitors.

, the two resort hotels on Lanai were managed by Four Seasons Hotels; the Four Seasons Resort Lanai in Manele Bay at Hulupoe Beach, just a few steps from where the ferry from Lāhainā docks, and the Lodge at Kōele in the mountains. The Hotel Lanai in Lanai City was built in 1923 by James Dole of the Hawaiian Pineapple Company as a lodge to house the executives overseeing the island's pineapple production. It was the island's only hotel until 1990.

Lanai is also home to three golf courses, one at each Four Seasons resort and a third, free course.
 The Challenge at Manele borders the ocean and was designed by Jack Nicklaus. Bill Gates was married on the 12th hole tee-box at The Challenge at Manele.
 The Experience at Koele is located in the mountains of Lanai and was designed by noted Southern California golf course architect Ted Robinson Sr, with input from Greg Norman.
 The Cavendish is a public golf course designed by E.B. Cavendish in 1947. It is a nine-hole course surrounded by Norfolk pines.

Shipwreck Beach on the north shore of the island is so named because of the remains of a wrecked vessel aground a short distance offshore. This is popularly referred to as a WW II Liberty Ship, although it is YOG-42, one of several concrete barges built during the war.

Transportation 

In Lanai City, there are no traffic lights, no shopping malls, and public transportation is supplied by the hotels. Most attractions outside of the hotels and town can be visited only via dirt roads that require an off-road vehicle, bicycle or walking.

Lanai is served by Lanai Airport, which offers air taxi and scheduled commercial operations to other Hawaiian islands.

Notable people
 Kiha Kaawa, the first Native Hawaiian to permanently emigrate to the United States mainland with permission from King Lunalilo in 1873 (prior to that native Hawaiian emigration was banned) was born in Palawai, Lanai. Taken to Salt Lake City, Utah and adopted by Latter-day Saint mission president George Nebeker, making Kiha Kaawa the first native Hawaiian to become a US citizen in 1873. {Kiha Kaawa Arrived in the United States in 1873, and was Adopted and took the Nebeker surname, Salt Lake City Utah, Census shows Nebeker namesake, by proxy making Kiha Kaawa Nebeker the first lawful Native Hawaiian becoming a US citizen.} {Rachel's SLC History: Hawaiian Royalty in Utah, mentions Hawaiian King David Kalakaua visiting with Kiha Kaawa in 1875 in Ogden Utah, the original articles can be seen in Utah records and archived articles}
 Danny Lockin, actor, dancer, born in Lanai in 1943. Best known for his role as Barnaby Tucker in the 1969 movie Hello, Dolly!, he played the same role in the Broadway play when it went on tour across the United States.

Gallery

See also
 National Register of Historic Places listings in Hawaii#Lanai

References

External links

 Lānaʻi Culture & Heritage Center
 
 
 

 
Islands of Hawaii
Maui County, Hawaii
Hawaiian–Emperor seamount chain
Private islands of the United States
Volcanoes of Maui Nui
Pleistocene shield volcanoes
Pleistocene Oceania
Cenozoic Hawaii
Shield volcanoes of the United States
Polygenetic shield volcanoes
Private islands of Oceania
Larry Ellison